Slender tarweed is a common name for several plants and may refer to:

Deinandra fasciculata, native to western North America
Madia gracilis